CHOO-FM was a radio station which broadcast on 101.7 MHz in Tofino, British Columbia, Canada from 2000 to 2002.

History
On July 15, 1999, P. L. M. Broadcasting Ltd. received approval from the Canadian Radio-television and Telecommunications Commission (CRTC) to operate a new FM radio station at Tofino. The new station would broadcast with 50 watts of power with a mixture of a MOR format, including modern and light rock, classic and modern country music as well as local talent, and a talk show. The station also provided native languages like Nuu-chah-nulth language, consisting of stories and native music, along with two hours of french-language programming weekly. Funding for the station was to be provided by the Ma-Mook Development Corporation, a non-profit business development corporation created by the five Central Region First Nations of the Nuu-chah-nulth Tribal Council.

CHOO-FM signed on at 101.7 MHz in early 2000. In 2001, the station switched to an adult contemporary format to attract more listeners. 

On January 15, 2002, CHOO-FM broadcasting at 50 watts on 101.7 MHz was shut down, due to a lack of advertising revenue and other problems. CHOO-FM's licence renewal was approved on August 15, 2005 (from September 1, 2005 to October 31, 2006).

The CHOO callsign was formerly used at a radio station in Ajax, Ontario from 1967 to 1994, which is known today as CJKX-FM. As of 2009, the current CHOO callsign now belongs to a radio station in Drumheller, Alberta, known as CHOO-FM.

References

External links
 CHOO Radio Recollections
 

HOO
HOO
Radio stations established in 2000
2000 establishments in British Columbia
2002 disestablishments in British Columbia
Radio stations disestablished in 2002

HOO-FM